James Daly (1852–1910) was an Irish nationalist politician and Member of Parliament (MP) in the House of Commons of the United Kingdom of Great Britain and Ireland.

He was first elected as the Irish National Federation (Anti-Parnellite) MP for the South Monaghan constituency at the 1895 general election. He was re-elected unopposed as the Irish Parliamentary Party MP at the 1900 general election.

He resigned in February 1902, owing chiefly to the refusal of the party leaders to publish the names of those members who were receiving payment from the Parliamentary fund and those who were not.

The subsequent by-election was won unopposed by John McKean of the Irish Parliamentary Party.

References

External links

1852 births
1910 deaths
Irish Parliamentary Party MPs
Anti-Parnellite MPs
Members of the Parliament of the United Kingdom for County Monaghan constituencies (1801–1922)
UK MPs 1895–1900
UK MPs 1900–1906
People from County Monaghan